By-elections to the 28th Alberta Legislature have been held to fill vacant seats in the Legislative Assembly of Alberta between the 2012 election and the 2015 election. Four by-elections were held to fill vacancies in the 28th Alberta Legislature, all in October 2014.

The by-elections were called by incoming premier Jim Prentice, who had been elected as the leader of the Alberta Progressive Conservatives on September 6, 2014. He subsequently appointed a new cabinet, which included two ministers who did not hold seats in the legislature. All four seats were open after the incumbent members resigned, and all resulted in holds for the Progressive Conservatives. One returned a Progressive Conservative member, when the incumbent was an independent, but he had been elected as a PC as well.

Calgary-West 
The riding of Calgary-West was vacated by incumbent MLA Ken Hughes in late September, 2014, after he failed to win the leadership contest for the Progressive Conservative Association of Alberta. The contest was instead won by Jim Prentice, who had been sworn in as premier earlier in that month.

The Progressive Conservative candidate, former police sergeant Mike Ellis won a narrow victory over Wildrose candidate Sheila Taylor. Taylor had resigned from the Calgary Public School Board in order to stand as a candidate in the by-election. This riding was one which the Wildrose expected to gain, given their dominance of the opinion polls under former premiers Dave Hancock and Alison Redford, but their candidate was defeated by a small margin. This result was consistent with province-wide opinion polling at the time, which saw a surge in support for the Progressive Conservatives under Prentice since he was elected as the party leader. Ellis was the only of the Progressive Conservative candidates to run that was not on the Executive Council of Alberta, the executive branch of Alberta's government. All other candidates were ministers, or in the case of Prentice, the premier.

The New Democrat candidate Brian Malkinson, who placed fourth in the 2014 Calgary-West by-election, went on to win the 2015 general election in the riding of Calgary-Currie less than a year later.

Calgary-West electoral result

Calgary-Foothills 

The riding of Calgary-Foothills was previously held by independent MLA Len Webber since the 2004 election. He had previously served within the Progressive Conservative caucus, but sat as an independent in protest of incumbent premier Alison Redford's leadership. Webber resigned on September 29, 2014, in order to stand as a candidate for the Conservative Party of Canada in the 2015 federal election in the riding of Calgary Confederation, thus vacating the seat and allowing Jim Prentice to stand for election in that riding. This was the second of four ridings contested on the October 27th by-elections.

The campaign for Calgary-Foothills involved door-knocking by Prentice himself, as well as TV and radio advertisements relating to government policy and the changes that Prentice had implemented, fixing popular concerns with his predecessors. The turnout for the riding was projected to be high, and Prentice was the favoured candidate in the polls. Prentice had been installed as the Premier of Alberta after winning the leadership contest for the Progressive Conservative Association of Alberta earlier in September, 2014. The by-election was required for him to take a seat in the legislature, which is a convention of Westminster-style parliamentary democracy in which the government leader is a member of the legislature.

The by-election in Calgary-Foothills resulted in the election of Jim Prentice to the Legislative Assembly of Alberta. Prentice won with a majority of 3,367, and 58% of the popular vote.

Calgary-Foothills electoral result

Edmonton-Whitemud 

The riding of Edmonton-Whitemund had been previously held by Dave Hancock, the former Premier of Alberta who had been elevated to the role after the resignation of Alison Redford. He was the deputy leader of the Progressive Conservatives, and became the interim leader while the party held a leadership election. However, the office of the Premier cannot be assigned on an interim basis, so Hancock formed a government and then resigned once Prentice was selected as the next leader of the Progressive Conservatives.

Running in the riding for the Progressive Conservatives was Stephen Mandel, who had been appointed to Prentice's cabinet on September 15 and was required by Prentice to win his seat in order to keep his  ministerial role. The riding was won by Mandel with 42% of the popular vote. This marked a ~18% decline from the 60% support that Hancock received in 2012.

Edmonton-Whitemund electoral result

Calgary-Elbow 
The riding of Calgary-Elbow was vacated with the resignation of Alison Redford in the summer of 2014. She had stepped down as Premier some months earlier, to be replaced by Dave Hancock until a successor could be chosen through a leadership election for the Progressive Conservative Association of Alberta.

The riding was contested for the Progressive Conservatives by Gordon Dirks, who was the Minister of Education in the government of Jim Prentice. As with Mandel, he was required to win his seat in order to retain his post. Dirks won the riding over Alberta Party candidate and leader Greg Clark (Canadian politician) with a majority of 803. Clark would later defeat Dirks in the 2015 election.

Calgary-Elbow electoral result

See also 
 List of Alberta by-elections for a list of all by-elections in Alberta, including tables of the incumbents and results.

References

Elections in Alberta
Provincial by-elections in Alberta